Tincup Lake Water Aerodrome  located on Tincup Lake, Yukon, Canada is open during the summer months and prior notice is required to land.

References

Registered aerodromes in Yukon
Seaplane bases in Yukon